D516 is a state road in the southern Croatia connecting Konfin border crossing to Montenegro to the D8 state road south of Cavtat.

The road, as well as all other state roads in Croatia, is managed and maintained by Hrvatske ceste, state owned company.

Road junctions and populated areas

Sources

See also
 Prevlaka

State roads in Croatia
Transport in Dubrovnik-Neretva County